Shaw Centre can refer to:
Shaw Centre (Ottawa), a conference centre in Ottawa, Ontario
Shaw Center for the Arts, a performing art venue, fine arts museum, and education center in Baton Rouge, Louisiana.
Shaw Centre for the Salish Sea, an aquarium and cultural learning centre in Sidney, British Columbia
Shaw House and Centre, a commercial and shopping complex in Singapore
Shaw Conference Centre, a conference centre in Edmonton, Alberta